Dracophyllum lessonianum, commonly known as the gumland grass tree, is a species of tree or shrub in the heath family Ericaceae. It is endemic to the North Island of New Zealand. D. lessonianum was first described by the French botanist Achille Richard in 1832.

References 

lessonianum
Endemic flora of New Zealand